The Partnership of a European Group of Aeronautics and Space UniversitieS (PEGASUS) is a network of aeronautical universities in Europe created in order to facilitate student exchanges and collaborative research between universities.
It has been originally created by the  groupement des écoles aéronautiques françaises (group of French aeronautical grandes écoles)  (ENAC, ENSMA and ISAE) in 1998.

The European manufacturers like Airbus have close contact with PEGASUS network.

Member universities 

The network consists of 25 universities in 10 countries:

: 
Czech Technical University in Prague
: 
École de l'air
École nationale de l'aviation civile (ENAC)
École nationale supérieure de mécanique et d'aérotechnique (ENSMA)
Institut Supérieur de l'Aéronautique et de l'Espace (ISAE)
École supérieure des techniques aéronautiques et de construction automobile (ESTACA)

:
RWTH Aachen University
Berlin Institute of Technology
Braunschweig University of Technology
Dresden University of Technology
University of Stuttgart
:
Polytechnic University of Milan
Polytechnic University of Turin
University of Naples Federico II
Sapienza University of Rome
University of Pisa
: 
Delft University of Technology
: 
Warsaw University of Technology
: 
Instituto Superior Técnico
: 
Technical University of Madrid
Technical University of Valencia
University of Seville
: 
Royal Institute of Technology
: 
Cranfield University
University of Bristol
University of Glasgow

External links

References 

European Group
Aeronautics and Space Universities
European Group
Engineering university associations and consortia
Scientific organizations established in 1998